The Mary Jane Girls were an American girl group formed in 1983, best known for their songs "In My House", "All Night Long", "Candy Man", and their cover version of "Walk Like a Man". They were protégées of musician Rick James and disbanded in 1987.

Joanne "Jojo" McDuffie was the lead singer, the others filling out the group's style and appearance. On the studio recordings, McDuffie was backed by session vocalists rather than the other Mary Jane Girls. The group released two albums in the 1980s, and recorded a third – which was shelved for decades but finally released in 2014, as part of a larger retrospective of Rick James' work.

The group was inducted into the Rhythm & Blues Music Hall of Fame in 2019.

Background
Rick James was frequently backed in his studio recordings by vocalists Joanne "Jojo" McDuffie and the sisters Maxine and Julia Waters. For live performances, starting in 1979, James was backed by McDuffie along with Cheryl Bailey (who used the stage name Cheri Wells), Candice "Candi" Ghant and Kimberly "Maxi" Wuletich. Casually amongst the musicians, McDuffie, Wells, Ghant and Wuletich used the moniker Mary Jane Girls, a subgroup of James' backing band, the Stone City Band. The women learned choreographed dance routines and they practiced under a vocal coach.

Career
In 1983, James proposed to Motown that McDuffie be offered a solo career but miscommunication caused the label to sign an all-female group, which he determined would be the Mary Jane Girls. James filled the positions behind McDuffie with Wells, Ghant and Wuletich. He also wrote all the original songs and produced all the recordings. Often compared to the protégées of his rival Prince, Vanity 6, who debuted in 1982, James told Jet in 1983 that he had come up with the concept six years prior but shelved the idea for a lack of time. "I wanted there to be a Black female group in the industry that could express more reality with relationships to men. I wanted there to be Black girls who could really speak about love, the pain, money, power, hate and everything. Originally there were going to be three girls in negligees doing the punk thing."

The Waters sisters and McDuffie sang all the parts on the group's eponymous debut album, Mary Jane Girls, released in April 1983. The album yielded their first R&B hits: "Candy Man", "All Night Long" (which was later included in the soundtrack of the 2002 video game Grand Theft Auto: Vice City), and "Boys". In live performances, the Mary Jane Girls were backed by the Stone City Band. The male band members also sang the background vocals to support McDuffie as lead vocalist. Cheri Wells left the group before the next album project was recorded. She was replaced by Yvette "Corvette" Marine.

The name of the group referenced mary jane, slang for marijuana; a favored recreational drug of James. (James wrote a hit song titled "Mary Jane".) The group's image was styled as containing a street-wise girl (McDuffie), a supermodel (Ghant), a cheerleader/valley girl (Wells, then Marine), and a dominatrix (Wuletich).

The group released their second album, Only Four You, in February 1985. McDuffie was featured on most of the songs, and the Waters sisters were hired to provide background vocals, since the other members were vocally limited. The lead single "In My House" became the group's biggest hit, reaching number 3 on the R&B chart and then crossing over to the Billboard Hot 100 chart, where it reached number 7 and spent 12 weeks in the Top 40. It also charted on the Hot Dance Club Play chart, peaking at number 1 for two weeks in April 1985. "Wild and Crazy Love" was the second single from this album and it also fared well on the R&B (number 10) and dance charts (number 3). It barely missed the Top 40 on the Billboard Hot 100, peaking at number 42. The last single, "Break It Up", only reached number 79 on the R&B chart and did not chart on the Billboard Hot 100, but it did hit number 39 on the Hot Dance Club Play chart.

A third album was recorded by the group, the project called Conversation, but it was shelved for decades, finally released in 2014 as part of a larger retrospective of James' work. However, a single was released from the project in 1986, a cover of The Four Seasons hit "Walk Like a Man", which was heard in the film A Fine Mess. This single charted at number 41 on the Billboard Hot 100. Another single, "Shadow Lover", was also released in 1986, and the Mary Jane Girls appeared on Soul Train to lip sync to it, but the single was not promoted by the label. Ghant obtained other work in 1986 when James and Motown were in dispute, since the Mary Jane Girls had no label support. The Mary Jane Girls officially disbanded in 1987.

Legacy
Cheri Wells was recruited away from the Mary Jane Girls by Morris Day to be the lead singer for his all-female band the Day Zs, which released one album and one single on Reprise in 1990. These releases did not chart.

In 1991, Marine sued Virgin Records, claiming that she had shared the lead vocals on the songs "Opposites Attract", "Knocked Out", and "I Need You" on Paula Abdul's debut album Forever Your Girl. In 1993, a jury ruled against Marine.

In 1995, the song "All Night Long" was remixed by Mike Gray and Jon Pearn subtitled "The Hustlers Convention Remixes", released on 12" vinyl and CD single. These remixes gained attention in dance clubs, and rose to number 51 in the UK. Also in 1995, McDuffie, Ghant and Wuletich performed on television on The Jenny Jones Show, billing themselves as MJG. They continued performing occasionally for a year or two.

McDuffie recorded with James on his 1997 Urban Rapsody album, on the torch song "Never Say You Love Me".

In 2001, Mary J. Blige reported that she had purchased the rights to the name "Mary Jane Girls" for the purpose of putting together a girl group composed of one Asian American, one African American, one Latina, and one white singer. Blige said she wanted the name because her own name was Mary Jane Blige. Blige did not pursue the project.

In 2003, the Mary Jane Girls were featured on VH1 in a "Where Are They Now?" episode. Ghant, Wells, Wuletich and Marine were interviewed together. McDuffie, coming off of a concert tour backing Barry White in Europe, appeared in a separate interview.

In 2009, McDuffie's husband Robert Funderburg applied for control of the trademark "Mary Jane Girls", but the application was abandoned in 2010. Later in 2010, Kimberly "Maxi" Wuletich applied for the trademark "MJG Starring Maxi and Cheri of the Original Mary Jane Girls", which she uses for performing with Cheri Wells. However, in 2013 the estate of Rick James sued Wuletich and Wells to stop them from performing under the name the Mary Jane Girls. The estate held that the group's name was owned by James, not the singers. In 2014, the Mary Jane Girls (Candice Ghant, Val Young, and Farah Melanson) received an honorary HAL Award.

The role of Julia and Maxine Waters as session singers on the group's albums was discussed in the documentary film 20 Feet from Stardom (2013). Maxine and Julia have performed with their brothers Oren and Luther as "the Waters", and they supported Paul Simon in 1991 on the Born at the Right Time Tour. The Waters toured with Neil Diamond as backup singers starting in 2005. Maxine Waters Willard and Julia Waters-Tillman have appeared separately and together as singers in a dozen films including The Lion King and Little Shop of Horrors.

Discography

Studio albums

Compilation albums
In My House: The Very Best of the Mary Jane Girls (1994, Motown)
20th Century Masters – The Millennium Collection: The Best of the Mary Jane Girls (2001, Motown)

Singles

References

External links
 Joanne "JoJo" McDuffie official website of JoJo
 

1983 establishments in California
1987 disestablishments in California
American contemporary R&B musical groups
American disco girl groups
American funk musical groups
American pop girl groups
American post-disco music groups
American soul musical groups
Dance-pop groups
Motown artists
Musical groups disestablished in 1987
Musical groups established in 1983
Musical groups from Los Angeles
Musical hoaxes
Vocal quartets